Christophe Arnold Janssens (born 9 March 1998) is a Belgian professional footballer who plays as a left back for Deinze.

Club career

Genk 
Janssens is a youth product of Genk

On 14 May 2017, Janssens made his debut in the first team as a substitute replacing Sebastien Dewaest in the 84th minute of a 2–0 away win over Royal Excel Mouscron in the UEFA Europa League play-offs in Belgium. On 27 May he played, again, in a UEFA Europa League play-offs match as a substitute replacing Omar Colley in the 85th minute of a 3–0 home win over Sint-Truidense.

Loan to MVV Maastricht 
On 1 July, Janssens was signed by Eerste Divisie side MVV Maastricht. On 18 August he made his debut for Maastricht as a starter, he score his first professional goal in the 28th minute of a 4–3 home win over Go Ahead Eagles. On 19 September he played in the first round of the KNVB Beker in a 3–2 home defeat against AZ Alkmaar.

Deinze
On 22 June 2021, he joined Deinze on a two-year contract.

Personal life
Janssens' twin brother Mathias is also a footballer and plays for Valour FC in Canada.

References

External links
 

1998 births
Living people
People from Verviers
Footballers from Liège Province
Belgian footballers
Association football defenders
K.R.C. Genk players
Belgian Pro League players
Challenger Pro League players
MVV Maastricht players
K.V.C. Westerlo players
K.M.S.K. Deinze players
Eerste Divisie players
Belgium youth international footballers
Belgian expatriate footballers
Expatriate footballers in the Netherlands
Belgian expatriate sportspeople in the Netherlands